is a passenger railway station in located in the city of Tanabe, Wakayama Prefecture, Japan, operated by West Japan Railway Company (JR West).

Lines

Station layout
The station consists of two opposed side platforms connected to the station building by a footbridge. The station is unattended.

Platforms

Adjacent stations

|-
!colspan=5|West Japan Railway Company (JR West)

History
Kii-Shinjō Station opened on December 20, 1933. With the privatization of the Japan National Railways (JNR) on April 1, 1987, the station came under the aegis of the West Japan Railway Company.

Passenger statistics
In fiscal 2019, the station was used by an average of 40 passengers daily (boarding passengers only).

Surrounding Area
 
 Tanabe City Hall Shinjo Liaison Office
 Wakayama Prefectural Tanabe High School
 Wakayama Prefectural Nanki High School
 Wakayama Prefectural Kamishima High School

See also
List of railway stations in Japan

References

External links

 Kii-Shinjō Station (West Japan Railway) 

Railway stations in Wakayama Prefecture
Railway stations in Japan opened in 1933
Tanabe, Wakayama